De Steenhuistermolen is a smock mill in Stiens, Friesland, Netherlands which was built in 1880. The mill is in working order and designated as being in reserve. It is listed as a Rijksmonument.

History
De Steenhuistermolen was built in 1880. Following storm damage in 1952, a windpump was erected to take over from De Steenhuistermolen. The mill was restored in 1955. Following damage in 1966, it was restored again in 1967. In 1969, an electric motor was installed to drive the Archimedes' screw. The mill was sold to Stichting De Fryske Mole on 4 September 1985, the 34th mill bought by that organisation. A further restoration was carried out in 2000. In 2006, the mill was officially designated as being in reserve. It is listed as a Rijksmonument, №24547.

Description

De Steenhuistermolen is what the Dutch describe as a Grondzeiler. It is a two storey smock mill on a single storey base. There is no stage, the sails reaching almost to ground level. The mill is winded by tailpole and winch. The smock and cap are thatched. The sails are Common sails. The sails are carried on a cast iron windshaft, which was cast by the Gietijzerij Hardinxveld-Giessendam in 1986. The windshaft carries the brake wheel which has 45 cogs. This drives the wallower (23 cogs) at  the top of the upright shaft. At the bottom of the upright shaft there are two crown wheels The upper crown wheel, which has 35 cogs drives an Archimedes' screw via a crown wheel. The lower crown wheel, which has 30 cogs is carried on the axle of an Archimedes' screw, which is used to drain the polder. The axle of the screw is  diameter. The screw is  diameter. It is inclined at 22°. Each revolution of the screw lifts  of water.

Public access
De Steenhuistermolen is open to the public by appointment.

References

Windmills in Friesland
Windmills completed in 1880
Smock mills in the Netherlands
Windpumps in the Netherlands
Agricultural buildings in the Netherlands
Rijksmonuments in Friesland
Octagonal buildings in the Netherlands